The .38 ACP (Automatic Colt Pistol), also known as the .38 Auto or 9x23mmSR, is a semi-rimmed pistol cartridge that was introduced at the turn of the 20th century for the John Browning-designed Colt M1900. It was first used in Colt's Model 1897 prototype, which he did not produce. The metric designation for the round is 9×23mm SR (semi-rimmed), which is not to be confused with other 9×23mm cartridges.

History
Initial loadings of this cartridge were quite powerful. However, these ballistics proved too violent for the Colt Model 1900 pistol, and velocities were soon lowered to below . Subsequent commercial loadings varied considerably in power.
With Army Ordnance favoring a return to a .45 caliber sidearm by the time the Colt autos in .38 ACP were introduced, the caliber never gained much popularity. However, they did see small but steady sales up until the introduction of the more powerful .38 Super, which was little more than the .38 ACP loaded back to its original ballistics.

Sales of .38 ACP ammunition enjoyed a modest spike during the surplus gun boom of the 1950s, 1960s, and 1970s; since the cartridges would usually cycle in Spanish surplus pistols like the Astra 400 that were chambered for the 9×23mm Largo, despite the fact that the .38 ACP was semi-rimmed and slightly shorter than the rimless 9mm Largo. Some Astra 400 pistols were stamped "9M/M&38" on the barrel, denoting that the barrel was specifically designed to chamber both 9mm Largo and .38 ACP.

Europe would eventually favor the 9×19mm Parabellum cartridge. This cartridge is ballistically similar to the .38 ACP but utilizes a smaller case and higher pressures.

Browning himself was not done with 9 mm cartridges and introduced the 9mm Browning Long in 1903 and the .380 ACP in 1908.

.38 Super

.38 Super was introduced in 1929, as a higher pressure loading of the .38 ACP. Even though .38 ACP and .38 Super are the same size, it is dangerous to use the more powerful .38 Super ammunition in a firearm intended for .38 ACP, as firearm damage may result. In the interest of safety, American ammunition companies formerly loaded .38 Super ammunition in nickeled cases exclusively. Since 1974, .38 Super cartridges have been marked with the +P markings used for greater pressure loads.

Firearms chambered for .38 ACP
Notable firearms chambered for this cartridge include:

 Colt M1900
 Colt M1902
 Colt M1903 Pocket Hammer
 Webley-Fosbery Automatic Revolver
 Webley Automatic Pistol
 M1911 pistol (civilian market)

See also
 List of handgun cartridges

References

External links
 The .38 Super Auto and .38 Auto (.38 ACP) by Chuck Hawks (subscription req)

 
Pistol and rifle cartridges
Military cartridges
Colt cartridges
Weapons and ammunition introduced in 1900